Top Chef: D.C. is the seventh season of the American reality television series Top Chef. The season was initially filmed in Washington, D.C. before concluding in Singapore, the series' first international venue. It premiered on June 16, 2010, and concluded on September 22, 2010. In the season finale, Kevin Sbraga was declared the winner over runners-up Angelo Sosa and Ed Cotton. Tiffany Derry was voted Fan Favorite.

Contestants
Seventeen chefs were selected to compete in Top Chef: D.C.

Angelo Sosa and Tiffany Derry returned to compete in Top Chef: All-Stars. Amanda Baumgarten returned for Top Chef: Charleston. Sosa returned again for Top Chef: All-Stars L.A.

Contestant progress

: The chef(s) did not receive immunity for winning the Quickfire Challenge.
: As a reward for winning the Quickfire Challenge, Kelly was allowed to sit out the Elimination Challenge.
 (WINNER) The chef won the season and was crowned "Top Chef".
 (RUNNER-UP) The chef was a runner-up for the season.
 (WIN) The chef won the Elimination Challenge.
 (HIGH) The chef was selected as one of the top entries in the Elimination Challenge, but did not win.
 (IN) The chef was not selected as one of the top or bottom entries in the Elimination Challenge and was safe.
 (LOW) The chef was selected as one of the bottom entries in the Elimination Challenge, but was not eliminated.
 (OUT) The chef lost the Elimination Challenge.

Episodes

References
Notes

Footnotes

External links
 Official website

Top Chef
2010 American television seasons
Television shows set in Washington, D.C.
Television shows filmed in Washington, D.C.
Television shows filmed in Virginia
Television shows filmed in Singapore